Naomi Snieckus is a Canadian actress and comedian, best known for her regular television role as Bobbi in Mr. D and her appearance as Nina in Saw 3D. She is also a podcast host.

Career 
An alumna of the Second City's Toronto company, she later formed the improvisational comedy troupes National Theatre of the World with Ron Pederson and Matt Baram, and Impromptu Splendor with Pederson, Baram and Kayla Lorette. She also acted extensively in guest appearances on television series, as well as extensive work in commercials, until her roles in Saw 3D and Mr. D.

From 2011 to 2014 she co-produced a webseries called The Casting Room.

In 2014, she appeared as a lead character in the film Two 4 One. In 2015, she and Baram, to whom she is now married, created an improv duo show called Baram & Snieckus: You & Me.

Snieckus is also the host of a podcast entitled Firecracker Department, in which she interviews female and non-binary artists, working across a variety of media. Subsequently, an international online community has been developed, which she also leads, in which members empower each other to take creative action through education and positive support.

Filmography

Film

Television

Awards

References

External links

Canadian television actresses
Canadian film actresses
Canadian stage actresses
Canadian women comedians
Actresses from Toronto
Comedians from Toronto
Living people
Canadian people of Lithuanian descent
Canadian sketch comedians
1974 births
Canadian Comedy Award winners